The West Augusta Football Club is an Australian rules football club based in West Augusta, Virginia. The club, established in 1915, currently competes in the Spencer Gulf Football League.

Premierships

Madigan Medalists
J.Martin - 1962
K.McSporran - 1974, 1975, 1976, 1985
B. Fazulla - 1996

Jumper
The West Augusta Football Club adopted the purple and white colours for its uniform and was admitted to the Port Augusta Football Association on 3 April 1915 . 

The choice of purple and white as the club's colours was initially suggested by West Side school teacher Mr. Sydney Mills, a Christian Brothers Old Collegian, who prevailed upon those present at the first meeting to adopt the colours of his old school in Adelaide.

Club song
We're a happy team at Westies.
We're the mighty fighting hawks. 
We love our club and we play to win.
Riding the bumps with a grin at Westies.
Come what may you'll find us striving.
Team work is the thing that talks.
All for one and one for all.
Is the way we play at Westies.
We are the mighty fighting hawks.

References

External links 
 
 Club profile at AFL National

Australian rules football clubs in South Australia
Australian rules football clubs established in 1915
1915 establishments in Australia